Tibor Yost (1896–1968) was a Hungarian journalist and screenwriter.

Selected filmography
 The Gypsy Baron (1935)
 Vagabonds (1949)
 When the Heath Dreams at Night (1952)
 Don't Ask My Heart  (1952)
 Cuba Cabana (1952)
 Desires (1952)
 Son Without a Home (1955)
 When the Alpine Roses Bloom (1955)
 The Priest from Kirchfeld (1955)
 The Bath in the Barn (1956)
 Almenrausch and Edelweiss (1957)
 The Gypsy Baron (1962)

References

Bibliography
 Ann C. Paietta. Saints, Clergy and Other Religious Figures on Film and Television, 1895-2003. McFarland, 2005.

External links

1896 births
1968 deaths
Male screenwriters
Hungarian male writers
Writers from Budapest
20th-century Hungarian screenwriters